Vindobala (Brytonnic Celtic : windo- fair, white, bala place, situation?, cf. Old Irish bal, bail place, situation, condition, (good) luck) was a Roman fort at the modern-day hamlet of Rudchester, Northumberland. It was the fourth fort on Hadrian's Wall, after Segedunum (Wallsend), Pons Aelius (Newcastle) and Condercum (Benwell). The site of the fort is bisected by the B6318 Military Road, which runs along the route of the wall at that point.

Description

The fort guards the valley of the March Burn to the west, an ancient route leading to the south towards the Tyne ford at Newburn. To the east the ground drops away to the Rudchester Burn. There were four main gates with double portals and two smaller, single-portal gates. There was one main gate on the north wall of the fort, and the east and west main gates opened on the north side of the Roman Wall. This left a single main gate on the south wall of the fort, and two smaller gates which probably gave access to a military way running along the south side of the Wall. There were towers at each corner of the fort, and also on either side of the main gates.

South of the fort, on the brow of a hill, is a cistern, twelve feet long, four and a half feet broad and two feet deep. It was popularly known as the “Giant’s Grave”.

Now there is little to be seen on the surface, apart from mounds to the south of the Military Road marking the west and south ramparts. During the eighteenth and nineteenth centuries stones were systematically removed from the site for local agricultural buildings, and also for the building of the Military Road.

Garrison
The fort was garrisoned in the fourth century by the First Cohort of Frisiavones. These were troops recruited from a coastal tribe of Lower Germany. It is thought that the fort was built for a cohort, 500 strong and part-mounted.

Excavations

In 1760 a life-size statue of Hercules was found at the site, which is now in the Great North Museum in nearby Newcastle upon Tyne.
Excavations of the site were carried out in 1924 and 1962. Two of the main gateways were excavated, as well as a large granary and part of the headquarters. In addition, a hypocaust belonging to the commandant's house was discovered.

Mithraeum
In 1844, five altars, dedicated to Mithras, were discovered near the site, now known as the Rudchester Mithraeum. It is believed that these come from a temple to Mithras, situated to the south east of the fort. It appears that this was built in the third century and was deliberately destroyed in the fourth century.

Curtain Wall
The north face was erected on a foundation course of coarse white stones. The first course was topped by an elaborately moulded plinth (unknown elsewhere). It has been speculated that this was the location of a special inscription stone marking work on the wall.

References

 J. Collingwood Bruce, Roman Wall (1863), Harold Hill & Son, 
 Frank Graham, The Roman Wall, Comprehensive History and Guide (1979), Frank Graham, 
 http://www.roman-britain.co.uk/places/vindobala/
 http://www.hadrians-wall.info/hadrianswall/vindobala/vindobala.htm

External links

 VINDOBALA FORT on the line of Hadrian's Wall as it exists today

Roman fortifications in England
Roman sites in Northumberland
Forts of Hadrian's Wall
Former populated places in Northumberland